Uja Tirche (literally High Mountain) is a peak close to the Tibetan border in the Nanda Devi group of the Kumaon/Garhwal Himalaya. It was first climbed in 1937 by Lieutenant (later Major-General) R C A Edge, with a surveying party from the Survey of India.

References
 Alpine Club Library  Himalayan Index
 International Association of Geodesy Obituary

Mountains of Uttarakhand